The UTEP Miners college football team represents University of Texas at El Paso (UTEP) in the West Division of Conference USA (CUSA). The Miners compete as part of the NCAA Division I Football Bowl Subdivision. The program has had 25 head coaches since it began play during the 1914 season.

The team has played more than 950 games over 98 seasons. In that time, only eight head coaches have led the Miners to postseason bowl games and played in the Sun Bowl eight different times. UTEP has a 5–9 record in 14 bowl games in which they have competed. The Miners have been conference champions twice in their history, once in the Border Conference and once in the Western Athletic Conference.

Saxon spent the most seasons (18) as the Miners' head coach and took the program to its first bowl game. The highest winning percentage by any coach is by Mike Brumbelow, who was the head coach of the team from 1950 to 1956, and went 46–24–3 (.651) in his career. 

The lowest winning percentage for any coach is by Thomas C. Holliday, who went 0–5 (.000) in 1921.

The current head coach of the Miners, Dana Dimel, was hired in December 2017.

Head coaches

Key

List of head coaches

Notes

References

UTEP

UTEP Miners football coaches